Plectromerus lingafelteri is a species of beetle in the family Cerambycidae. It was described by Micheli and Nearns in 2005.

References

Cerambycinae
Beetles described in 2005